Lord Henry Richard Charles Somerset, PC, DL, JP (7 December 1849 – 10 October 1932) was a British Conservative politician and composer of popular music. He served as Comptroller of the Household under Benjamin Disraeli between 1874 and 1879.

Background
Somerset was the second son of Henry Somerset, 8th Duke of Beaufort, by his wife Lady Georgiana Charlotte Curzon, daughter of Richard Curzon-Howe, 1st Earl Howe. He was the brother of Henry Somerset, 9th Duke of Beaufort, and Lord Arthur Somerset.

Political career
Somerset was elected at a by-election in 1871 as Member of Parliament (MP) for Monmouthshire, and held the seat until he stood down at the 1880 general election. When the Conservatives came to power in 1874 under Benjamin Disraeli, he was sworn of the Privy Council and appointed Comptroller of the Household, a post he held until 1879. Apart from his political career he was also a Deputy Lieutenant of Monmouthshire and a justice of the peace for Herefordshire and Monmouthshire.

Family
Somerset married Lady Isabella Caroline Somers-Cocks, the eldest daughter and co-heir of Charles Somers-Cocks, 3rd Earl Somers, on 6 February 1872. They had one child, Henry Charles Somers Augustus (1874–1945), but their marriage collapsed after a few years because of Lord Henry's infatuation with a seventeen-year-old boy. As a result, he withdrew to Italy, while his wife was ostracised from society for having made public, contrary to the conventions of the time, why she had left him. She died in March 1921. Somerset remained a widower until his death in October 1932, aged 82.

Somerset's only son, Henry Charles Somers Augustus Somerset (1874–1945), married twice. The first wife, Lady Katherine, was a daughter of William Beauclerk, 10th Duke of St Albans; their grandson, David Somerset, 11th Duke of Beaufort, would succeed to the dukedom of Beaufort in 1984. The second wife, who he married on 28 January 1932, was Brenda, dowager Marchioness of Dufferin and Ava, widow of Frederick Hamilton-Temple-Blackwood, 3rd Marquess of Dufferin and Ava, and only daughter of Major Robert Woodhouse, of Orford House, Bishop's Stortford, Hertfordshire. They had no issue.

Poetry and Music
Somerset is the author of a book of poetry, Songs of adieu (1889), which the scholar Timothy D'Arch Smith has identified as "the first book of Uranian verse".   He was also a composer of several songs including A song of sleep (Ricordi, 1903). His setting to music of Christina Rossetti's Echo enjoyed considerable success when it was published by Chappell & Co. c.1900.

References

External links 

1849 births
1932 deaths
Conservative Party (UK) MPs for Welsh constituencies
Members of the Privy Council of the United Kingdom
UK MPs 1868–1874
UK MPs 1874–1880
Younger sons of dukes
H
English justices of the peace
Welsh justices of the peace
Non-inheriting heirs presumptive